Gary Blackwood (born October 23, 1945) is an American author who is known for The Shakespeare Stealer trilogy.

Biography
Born in Meadville, Pennsylvania on October 23, 1945, Blackwood sold his first story when he was nineteen. 

In 1998, he published The Shakespeare Stealer, a historical fiction novel about an orphan, Widge, who is sent to steal Hamlet from William Shakespeare and The Lord Chamberlain's Men. After it won the 1999 ALA Best Book for Young Adults, Blackwood published two sequels, Shakespeare's Scribe (2000) and Shakespeare's Spy (2003). 

Since then, he has continued writing historical fiction, such as Around the World in 100 Days (2010), which the Smithsonian named a 2010 Notable Book for Children and Kirkus Book Reviews one of 2010's Best Books for Teens. In 2017, he branched out into adult fiction with a Victorian mystery featuring Charles Frederick Field, Bucket’s List, and followed it with a sequel, Bucket’s Brigade (2019).

Blackwood is also a widely produced playwright. In 2001, the John F. Kennedy Center for the Performing Arts commissioned him to write a one-act play of The Shakespeare Stealer; two years later, Seattle Children's Theatre commissioned a full-length version that has since been staged by a number of other professional theatres, including Nashville Children's Theatre and Children's Theatre of Charlotte.

Awards
 1990 Friends of American Writers Best Young Adult Novel for The Dying Sun
 Ozark Creative Writers Conference 1st prize for Attack of the Mushroom People
 Missouri Scriptworks 1st prize for Dark Horse
 1999 ALA Best Book for Young Adults for The Shakespeare Stealer
 2010 Smithsonian's Notable Books for Children for Around the World in 100 Days
 2010 Best Books for Teens by Kirkus Book Reviews for Around the World in 100 Days

Works

 The Lion and the Unicorn (1983)
 Wild Timothy (1987)
 The Dying Sun (1989)
 Beyond the Door (1991)
 Time Masters (1995)
 The Shakespeare Stealer (1998)
 Moonshine (1999)
 Shakespeare's Scribe (2000)
 The Year of the Hangman (2002)
 Shakespeare's Spy (2003)
 Second Sight (2005)
 The Great Race: The Amazing Round-the-World Auto Race of 1908 (2008)
 Mysterious Messages: A History of Codes and Ciphers (2009)
 Around the World in 100 Days (2010)
The Imposter (2012)
Curiosity (2014) 
Bucket's List (2017)
Bucket's Brigade (2019)

References

External links 

 
 

1945 births
Living people
People from Meadville, Pennsylvania
Grove City College alumni
American children's writers
20th-century American novelists
20th-century American male writers
Novelists from Pennsylvania
21st-century American novelists
American male novelists
21st-century American male writers